Barretta is a rural locality in the local government area (LGA) of Kingborough in the Hobart LGA region of Tasmania. The 2016 census recorded a population of 41 for the state suburb of Barretta.

History 
Barretta was gazetted as a locality in 1965. It is believed that the name was derived from an early settler family named Barrett.

Geography
The waters of North-West Bay form most of the eastern boundary.

Road infrastructure 
Route B68 (Channel Highway) runs through from north to south.

References

Towns in Tasmania
Localities of Kingborough Council